Bertrand Pancher (born 5 June 1958, in Saint-Mihiel) is a French politician of the Radical Party (Rad) who has been serving as a member of the National Assembly of France since the 2007 elections, representing the Meuse department.

Political career 
In the National Assembly, Pancher has been a member of the Committee on Cultural Affairs and Education since 2019. He has previously served on the Committee on Legal Affairs (2007-2009) and the Committee on Sustainable Development and Spatial Planning (2009-2020). In addition to his committee assignments, he is part of the French parliamentary friendship groups with the Democratic Republic of the Congo, Niger, and Tunisia.

In 2018, Pancher was one of the founding members of the Liberties and Territories (LT) parliamentary group, which he has been co-chairing with Philippe Vigier (2018-2020) and Sylvia Pinel (since 2020).

References

1958 births
Living people
People from Saint-Mihiel
Politicians from Grand Est
Union for French Democracy politicians
Union for a Popular Movement politicians
Radical Party (France) politicians
Union of Democrats and Independents politicians
Radical Movement politicians
Deputies of the 13th National Assembly of the French Fifth Republic
Deputies of the 14th National Assembly of the French Fifth Republic
Deputies of the 15th National Assembly of the French Fifth Republic
Deputies of the 16th National Assembly of the French Fifth Republic